They Can't Deport Us All is Chingo Bling's third album and first major album with Asylum Records released on August 14, 2007.  The lead singles are "Do The Lasso" and "Like This and Like That".  Production comes mostly come from Carnival Beats and Shadow Ramirez. Also Scott Storch produced a track on the album. The album debut at #123 with over 6,000 copies sold in the first week. The album also has a chopped and screwed version by Eddie DeVille.

Track listings
They Can't Deport Us All
Southside Thang (feat. Paul Wall & Fat Pat)
Still Goin' Down! (feat. Fat Pat)
Chinglish 4 Dummies (Skit)
Ball Everywhere I Go (feat. Lucky Luciano)
Werk That (Funky Mañosa)
In Case They Forgot (feat. Latasha)
Like This N Like That
I'ma Do This
Bob O'Riley (Border Skit)
Show That Chit (feat. Russell Lee)
Head Honcho (feat. Baby Bash)
Lil' Marvin (So Fantabulous)
Do The Lasso (feat. Mistah F.A.B. & Fabo)
Jimmy Dean Boberry (Drive Thru Skit)
Tira Te Patrazz (feat. ICE)
Hangin' On (My Song) (feat. Coast & Stunta)

Controversy
Chingo Bling had been criticized for the title of his second album They Can't Deport Us All.  He was interviewed on CW39 News and said his family's tamale truck has been shot at, vandalized and even, on one occasion, stolen. He also stated he had received racist death threats from White nationalist groups, but still does not intend to change his album's title. Music critics often associated his music with violent street gangs.
Chingo also alleges that he was refused the opportunity to appear at a scheduled in-store album signing at a Dallas shopping mall as a direct result of the controversy surrounding his clothing and album name.  He also asserts that he is the target of numerous Conservative journalists and right wing bloggers who criticize him because of his music and marketing concepts related to immigration.

References

2007 debut albums